John Bird (1709–1776) was a British mathematical instrument maker. He was born at Bishop Auckland. He came to London in 1740 where he worked for Jonathan Sisson and George Graham. By 1745 he had his own business in the Strand. Bird was commissioned to make a brass quadrant 8 feet across for the Royal Observatory at Greenwich, where it was mounted on 16 February 1750, and where it is still preserved. Soon after, duplicates were ordered for France, Spain and Russia.

Bird supplied the astronomer James Bradley with further instruments of such quality that the commissioners of longitude paid him £500 (a huge sum) on condition that he take on an apprentice for  7 years and produce in writing upon oath, a full account of his working methods. This was the origin of Bird's two treatises The Method of Dividing Mathematical Instruments (1767) and The Method of Constructing Mural Quadrants (1768). Both had a foreword from the astronomer-royal Nevil Maskelyne. When the Houses of Parliament burned down in 1834, the standard yards of 1758 and 1760, both constructed by Bird, were destroyed.

Bird, with his fellow County Durham savant William Emerson, makes an appearance in Mason & Dixon, the acclaimed novel by Thomas Pynchon.

References

Further reading

External links

 Biography on South Seas Companion
 https://web.archive.org/web/20040317000544/http://albinoni.brera.unimi.it/HEAVENS/MUSEO/Schede/app1.html

1709 births
1776 deaths
18th-century British astronomers
British scientific instrument makers
People from Bishop Auckland